Illico was a free bimonthly French LGBT magazine, founded in March 1988 and ceased publication in 2007.

Overview
It had a circulation of around 40,000 and was composed primarily of articles and opinion polls about current events, as well as information relating to gay culture, activism, and local Parisian issues.

Controversy
On 20 April 2007, the magazine's editors received a letter from the Minister of the Interior threatening to ban the magazine, on the pretext that its content could agitate the youth. The editors had made no attempt to hide their opposition to the government's candidate, Nicolas Sarkozy, in the presidential elections that year. However, three weeks later, the government said there would be no such ban.

See also
Têtu
PREF mag

References

External links
 Official site 

1988 establishments in France
2007 disestablishments in France
Bi-monthly magazines published in France
Defunct magazines published in France
Free magazines
LGBT-related magazines published in France
Magazines established in 1988
Magazines disestablished in 2007
Magazines published in Paris